The Liberty Bell in Denver is a replica of the original Liberty Bell, installed outside the Colorado State Capitol. The bell was 1 of 53 replicas cast in France in 1950.

References

External links

 

Individual bells in the United States
Outdoor sculptures in Denver